Carolan is a surname that is an Anglicized form of Gaelic Ó Cearbhalláin, meaning ‘descendant of Cearbhallán’, which is a diminutive of the personal name Cearbhall (see Carroll). Notable people with the name include the following:

 Brett Carolan (born 1971), American football player
 Brian Carolan (1927 – 1983), Australian sailor
 Cathal Carolan, Irish Gaelic footballer 
 Edwin Carolan (died 1982), Irish Gaelic footballer
 Joe Carolan (born 1937), Irish football player
 Joey and Patrick Carolan, Canadian professional wrestlers collectively known as the All-Knighters
 Kate Carolan (born 1982), Irish-American news reporter
 Kevin Carolan (born 1968), American actor
 Michael Carolan (1875 – 1930), Irish republican activist
 Niall Carolan (born 2002), Irish Gaelic footballer
 Nigel Carolan (born 1974), Irish rugby coach
 Ray Carolan, Irish Gaelic footballer 
 Reggie Carolan (1939–1983), American football player
 Robert F. Carolan (born 1945), American judge
 Ronan Carolan, Gaelic footballer 
 Stuart Carolan, Irish screenwriter, producer, and playwright
 Tom Carolan (born 1961), American music executive and entrepreneur.
 Trevor Carolan (born 1951), Canadian writer

See also

 Turlough O'Carolan (1670–1738), Irish harper and composer
Carola
Carolan (disambiguation)
Carolane Soucisse
Carolann
Carolean (disambiguation)
Carolyn

Gaelic-language surnames